Dobbins is an unincorporated community within Elliott County, Kentucky, United States. Its post office is closed.

References

Unincorporated communities in Elliott County, Kentucky
Unincorporated communities in Kentucky